Wally Stocker (born Walter Frederick Stocker, 27 March 1953, London, England) is an English rock guitarist, perhaps best known as the lead guitarist with The Babys.

The Babys disbanded in 1981 and he toured with Rod Stewart and Air Supply, as well as Humble Pie Featuring Jerry Shirley, Jimmy Barnes and Zoomer. He lived in Florida for a stretch before returning to Los Angeles when The Babys got back together and recorded a new CD, I'll Have Some of That!.

He is married to Susan Smith Stocker.

External links
The Babys Official Unofficial Archives and Chronological History Based on the Archives of Adrian Millar and Michael John Siddons-Corby
The Babys Official Contains rare unreleased songs and video clips of The Babys.

1953 births
Living people
Musicians from London
The Babys members
English rock guitarists